The 2014–15 Clemson Tigers women's basketball team will represent Clemson University during the 2014–15 college basketball season. Audra Smith resumes the responsibility as head coach for a second consecutive season. The Tigers, members of the Atlantic Coast Conference, will play their home games at the Littlejohn Coliseum. They finished the season 9–21, 1–15 in ACC play to finish in a tie for fourteenth place. They lost in the first round of the ACC women's tournament to Georgia Tech.

2014–15 media

Clemson Tigers IMG Sports Network
The Clemson Tigers IMG Sports Network will broadcast all Tigers games. WCCP will broadcast select games. Games not on WCCP can be found online through the athletic website. Play-by-play will rotate while Dory Kidd will provide the analysis. Non-televised home games can be watched online via Tigercast with the Tigers Sports Network call.

2014–15 Roster

Schedule

|-
!colspan=9 style="background:#FF5F01; color:#522D80;"|Exhibition

|-
!colspan=9 style="background:#FF5F01; color:#522D80;"|Regular Season

|-
!colspan=9 style="background:#522D80;"| 2015 ACC Tournament

Rankings
2014–15 NCAA Division I women's basketball rankings

References

Clemson Tigers women's basketball seasons
Clemson
Clemson Tig
Clemson Tig